Karsten totoyensis is a species of goby native to the western Pacific Ocean where it has been recorded from the Philippines, Fiji and Indonesia. This species grows to a length of  SL. This species is the only known member of its genus, whose name honours Karsten E. Hartel, a Curatorial Associate in Ichthyology at the Museum of Comparative Zoology of Harvard University, for his assistance to the describer's studies as well as assisting others over the years.

References

Amblyopinae
Fish described in 1903